Argyresthia prenjella is a moth of the  family Yponomeutidae. It is found in Croatia and Bosnia and Herzegovina.

The wingspan is 12–13 mm.

References

Moths described in 1901
Argyresthia
Moths of Europe